The Garafiri Dam is an embankment dam on the Konkouré River which forms the boundary between the Kindia and Mamou Regions of Guinea. The dam was constructed by Salini Impregilo between 1995 and 1999 for the purpose of hydroelectric power generation and water supply. The power station had a breakdown in 2002 but was repaired shortly afterwards.

See also

 Energy in Guinea
 List of power stations in Guinea

References

Dams completed in 1999
Energy infrastructure completed in 1999
Dams in Guinea
Hydroelectric power stations in Guinea
Earth-filled dams
Kindia Region
1999 establishments in Guinea

no:Garafiri vannkraftverk